Varronianus ( 363 – 380 AD) was the son of the emperor Jovian.

Biography
Varronianus was the first of two sons born to the emperor Jovian and Charito, daughter of Lucillianus. Upon his father's accession to the imperial throne, Varronianus was given the title of Nobilissimus, and in AD 364, he was appointed consul alongside his father at Ancyra. As he was still an infant when his father died in 364, he was overlooked for the succession, and Valentinian I was elected instead.

It is possible that Varronianus was the young man referred to by John Chrysostom in two of his letters and homilies ("Homilies on Philippians" and "Letter to a Young Widow"). If so, it appears that Varronianus was still alive in 380, but was living in fear of his life, due to his imperial descent. At some point, he had one of his eyes removed, probably in an attempt to prevent him from making a claim to the throne.

Sources
 Martindale, J. R.; Jones, A. H. M, The Prosopography of the Later Roman Empire, Vol. I AD 260–395, Cambridge University Press (1971)

References

4th-century Romans
4th-century Roman consuls
Imperial Roman consuls
Year of birth unknown
Year of death unknown
4th-century deaths
4th-century births
Constantinian dynasty
Nobilissimi
Sons of Roman emperors